The Kharlovskoye mine is a large iron mine located in eastern Russia in the Sakha Republic. Kharlovskoye represents one of the largest iron ore reserves in Russia and in the world having estimated reserves of 4 billion tonnes of ore grading 15.3% iron metal.

See also 
 List of mines in Russia

References 

Iron mines in Russia